The Christian School at Castle Hills, formerly Castle Hills First Baptist Schools, is a private Christian school located in Castle Hills, Texas. It is accredited by the Association of Christian Schools International. The Christian School at Castle Hills serves approximately 600 students from preschool to 12th grade.

History 
Castle Hills First Baptist School was founded in 1981 by Pastor George H. Harris and several members of Castle Hills First Baptist Church. The school initially served kindergarten through 6th grade, with an enrollment of about 100 students. In 2020, there were approximately 650 students enrolled from preschool (6 weeks) through the 12th grade. The Christian School at Castle Hills severed its association with Castle Hills First Baptist Church in 2016, becoming an independent Christian school and changing its name to "The Christian School at Castle Hills".

Athletics 

Castle Hills has received multiple Texas Association of Private and Parochial Schools Division 4A Awards. The first of these was the boys soccer program in the 1997–1998 season. Other awards include 2 state championships for boys varsity volleyball in the early 2000s.

Fine Arts 
The Castle Hills secondary choir received back-to-back state titles in 2010 and 2011.

Notable alumni

Matt Krause (Class of 1998), Republican member of the Texas House of Representatives from District 93 in Fort Worth

References 

1981 establishments in Texas
Baptist schools in the United States
Christian schools in Texas
Educational institutions established in 1981
Private K-12 schools in Texas
Schools in Bexar County, Texas
High schools in Bexar County, Texas